Mohan Reddy may refer to:

 B. Mohan Reddy, Indian politician and Member of Legislative Council
 Silpa Mohan Reddy, Indian politician, legislator and Member of Legislative Assembly
 V. Mohan Reddy, Indian Academic
 B V R Mohan Reddy, Indian businessman and founder of Cyient